Nordfyn Municipality is a municipality (Danish: kommune) in Region of Southern Denmark on the north coast of the island of Funen in central Denmark. The municipality covers an area of 452.30 km2 and has a total population of 29,714 (2022). It borders Odense Municipality to the east and south, Assens Municipality to the south and Middelfart Municipality to the west. To the east, Odense Fjord separates Nordfyn Municipality and Kerteminde Municipality. The mayor of the municipality is Morten Andersen, a member of the Venstre political party. The seat of the municipality is the town of Bogense.

The municipality includes the inhabited islands of Æbelø, as well as the uninhabited islands and islets of Dræet, Ejlinge, Vigelsø, Skalø, Dørholm, Pludderholm, Gersø, Kyholm, Leammer, Trindelen, Ægholm, Drættegrund, Drætlingen, Lindholm and the islet group of Mågeøerne.

The municipality was formed in 2007 as a result of the 2007 Municipal Reform, where the municipalities of Bogense, Otterup and Søndersø were merged. It was originally planned that the new municipality should have used the existing name of Bogense Municipality but a local referendum preferred the name Nordfyn and this decision was approved by the Danish Interior Minister, Lars Løkke Rasmussen, in June 2006.

History
Bogense was established as a mercantile center around 1200, built around a ferry dock with access to Klakring in Jutland. The first merchant privileges were given to Bogense in the later half of the 1200s, though it may have received them even earlier. The ferry service was an important industry, as was their exports of grain and cattle. The town grew to a large and wealthy town, but a fire in 1575 burnt down most of the town. The town began shrinking and became the smallest market town on Fyn. In 1672 only 438 people lived in Bogense. After the 1800s the town slowly recovered, though the ferry service was completely shut down in 1854. The town got a railway connection to Odense in 1882, and the harbour was expanded several times throughout the years.

The area around Bogense were part of the hundreds called Skovby Hundred. The rest of the modern territory of Nordfyn Municipality were part of the hundreds of Lunde and Skam. Until 1662 Skovby Hundred was a part of Rugård Fief while Lunde and Skam were part of Odensegård Fief. In 1662, Denmark's administrative divisions were changed. Fiefs (Danish: Len) were dissolved and the country split into counties. Rugård Fief became Rugård County and Odensegård Fief became Odensegård County. These counties merged with Assens County and Hindsgavl County in 1793 to form Odense County. This county lasted until 1970 when it merged with Svendborg County to form Funen County. In the 2007 Municipal Reform, the counties were dissolved and regions implemented. All of Funen County came under the Region of Southern Denmark.

The hundreds, market towns and birks were dissolved in the municipal reform of 1970 and split Denmark into 277 municipalities. Bogense Municipality was formed by merging five parish municipalities and Bogense Market Town Municipality. Otterup Municipality was formed by merging nine parish municipalities and Søndersø Municipality was formed by merging seven parish municipalities. In the 2007 Municipal Reform, the three municipalities of Bogense, Otterup and Søndersø merged to form Nordfyn Municipality.

Historical divisions 
The table below shows the historical municipal subdivisions of Nordfyn Municipality.

Towns 

Below are all settlements in the municipality with populations of at least 200 people (populations as of 2021).

Bogense

Bogense is located on the northern coast of Fyn, 24 km north-west of Odense. It is the seat of the municipality, although not the municipality's largest settlement. In the southern part of the town is an industrial quarter. Centrally in the town is a camping ground Bogense Strand Camping, which serves as a popular tourist spot in the summer months with approximately 230 camping spots.

The town has two harbours: Bogense Harbour and Marina (Danish: Bogense Havn og Marina) and Bogense Fishery Harbour (Danish: Bogense Fiskerihavn). Around the two harbours are many facilities, such as cafés, restaurants, workshops and fish shops.

Located centrally in Bogense is a replica statue of Manneken Pis. It is occasionally dressed up in clothes. Also located in Bogense are Nordfyn Museum and Bogense Church. Dansk Sprognævn is located in Bogense.

Otterup

Otterup is located in the eastern part of the municipality, approximately 10 km north of Odense. It is the largest settlement in the municipality, measured by population. Located centrally in the town are speciality shops and several facilities, including a library and a museum. In the southern part of town is an industrial quarter, as well as several market gardens.

Sights in Otterup include Otterup Church, Otterup Museum and Otterup Rifle Factory (Danish: Otterup Geværfabrik). The rifle factory today houses art exhibitions, having shut down rifle manufacturing in 1994.

Søndersø

Søndersø is located in the southern part of the municipality, 10 km south-west of Otterup, 13 km south-east of Bogense and 10 km north-west of Odense. Located in the southern part of the town is an industrial quarter that it home to the Danish factories of Orkla, including KiMs. Also located in the industrial quarter are companies specializing in plastic and metals.

Dallund Castle is located near Søndersø. Søndersø Church is located in Søndersø.

Villages

With few large towns in the municipality, 35-40% of the citizens of Nordfyn Municipality live in smaller settlements, villages and rural areas. Many villages and small settlements have local councils that handle local matters.

Located at the northern border of Morud is the Ditlevsdal Bison Farm, the largest bison farm in Europe. It is open for activities with the bisons, and also sell the meat of the farm's bisons.

In the small settlement of Hindevad, located in the southern part of the municipality, is the Kongsdal Open Gardens (Danish: Kongsdal Åben Have). It is an open garden, spanning 20,000 m2, with many different flowers, exotic plants and trees.

Beldringe is located on the south-eastern border of the municipality, next to the Hans Christian Andersen Airport. By the airport is a museum about the Nazi occupation of Denmark during World War II, with the museum specifically focussing on Fyn during the occupation.

In addition to these villages, there are a number of smaller settlements in the municipality. These are all the settlements with populations of less than 200 people:

Nature

A large section of Nordfyn Municipality is part of a Natura 2000 area, meant to protect the nature in the ara. Plans have also been established for creating a nature park in and around the municipality's Natura 2000 areas. These areas include Æbelø, the ocean around it and long stretches of the municipality's coast.

Ejlinge is a small uninhabited island located in the northern part of the municipality. The island is privately owned and is currently uninhabited.

50 acres of Agernæs Storskov on the peninsula of Agernæs is protected. The forest contains the largest concentration of naturally growing oak on Fyn. The forest was protected to conserve the rich biodiversity in the forest, namely with many different insect species. These include many rare butterflies and moths, such as nemapogon falstriella.

Also protected in the municipality is the peninsula of Nørreby Hals, which is a breeding spot for many birds such as the pied avocet. Another protected peninsula is Enebærodde, where 296 acres were protected in 1988. Other protected areas in the municipality include a stretch of coast called Kissebjerg, an esker called Grindløse Ås and a bog called Lisbjerg Mose.

Æbelø and Dræet

Æbelø and Dræet are two islands located in the northern part of the municipality. The two islands are located roughly 100 meters apart, with Dræet located further south than Æbelø. The islands are only accessible by boat or by foot during low tide. The entirety of the two islands, the surrounding ocean and islets are protected, and it is not allowed to visit the islands during breeding season. Æbelø is owned by nature organization Age V. Jensen Naturfond. The island has a very small population in the summer, and is de facto uninhabited during the winter. Dræet has been uninhabited since the 1960s.

Æbelø was protected in 1998 to protect its nature. Various different plants and trees are found on the island, including the European crab apple, which gave the island its name - Æbelø directly translates to "apple island". Fallow deer live on both Æbelø and Dræet. The mouflon sheep can be found on Æbelø, though is not native to the island, but was introduced as an animal for hunting. The same has historically been the case for pheasants, but they are no longer brought to the island. The golden oriole is rare in Denmark, but breeds on Æbelø.

Vigelsø

Vigelsø is the largest island in Odense Fjord with an area of 132 acres. The island was historically much smaller, but was artificially expanded after dikes were built. It is not allowed to visit the southern part of the island, to protect the birds on the island. The northern part of the island is accessible, however, with a marked hiking trail, playground and ferry connection.

Politics
Nordfyn Municipality was established on 1 January 2007 as a result of the Municipal Reform of 2007. The municipalities of Bogense, Otterup and Søndersø were merged to form the new Nordfyn Municipality.

On the table below is an overview of all elections held in Denmark since the 2007 Municipal Reform. The percentages in the table are the local results from Nordfyn Municipality. The party with the most votes received is shaded in their respective color. Venstre and the Social Democrats have been the largest parties in all but one election. The two parties tend to be fairly close in size. In the 2014 European Parliament election the largest party in the municipality became the Danish People's Party. This was the case in most of the country, and the first time in Denmark's history that the party had been the largest party in a nationwide election.

Municipal council
Nordfyn's municipal council consists of 25 members, elected every four years. The municipal council has six political committees.

Below are the municipal councils elected since the Municipal Reform of 2007.

Mayors
Since the 2007 municipal reform, the mayors of Nordfyn Municipality have been:

Economy
The largest industries in Nordfyn Municipality, by number of employees, are social institutions, retail, agriculture and construction.

Companies with their headquarter in Nordfyn Municipality include snack company KiMs, part of the Orkla ASA. KiMs is located in Søndersø.

Demographics

There are 29,549 people living in Nordfyn Municipality (2021). 49.46% are women and 50.54% are men.

Below is the age distribution of the municipality.

Education
There are 14 ground schools, 4 efterskoler and 2 independent schools in the municipality. There is also 1 gymnasium, 1 folk high school and 1 youth school in the municipality.

There are 3 libraries in the municipality: in Otterup, Bogense and Søndersø.

Sights

Nordfyn Municipality is sparsely populated with many small towns and villages, resulting in few major attractions. There are however, several smaller attractions scattered around the municipality.

A replica statue of Manneken Pis is located centrally in Bogense. It is occasionally dressed up in clothes.
The Ditlevsdal Bison Farm is located at the northern border of Morud. It is the largest bison farm in Europe. It is open for activities with the bisons, and also sell the meat of the farm's bisons.
Kongsdal Open Garden (Danish: Kongsdal Åben Have) is an open garden, spanning 20,000 m2, with many different flowers, exotic plants and trees. It is located south of Hindevad.
Located by the Hans Christian Andersen Airport is a museum about the Nazi occupation of Denmark during World War II, with the museum specifically focussing on Fyn during the occupation.
The Glavendrup stone is located near the settlement of Glavendrup. It is a runestone, and the runestone with the longest inscription in Denmark.
Nordfyn Museum (Danish: Nordfyns Museum) is a local history museum about Bogense and the municipality's area. It is located in Bogense.
Otterup Museum is a local history museum about Otterup. It is located in Otterup. The museum building is the oldest in the town, originating from 1722.
The Aero Mill (Danish: Aeromøllen) is a former wind mill and the largest location on Bogense's harbour. The mill was built in 1942 by F. L. Smith and opened on 21 January 1943. The wings were dismantled from the mill in 1953.
Bogø Pump Mill (Danish: Bogø Pumpemølle) is a pump mill used to dam in Odense Fjord. It was built in 1873 and is located in Bogø Huse. The wings of the mill were removed shortly after the Second World War.
Bogense Water Tower (Danish: Bogense Vandtårn) is a former water tower located centrally in Bogense. It was built in 1910 and was in use until 1996. Today it exhibits art installations.

Churches
See List of churches in Nordfyn Municipality

Notable residents

Public thought and politics

Adam Wilhelm Moltke (1785 on Egebjerggård — 1864), politician and the first Prime Minister of Denmark from 1848 to 1852.
Klaus Berntsen (1844 in Eskilstrup — 1927), politician and Council President of Denmark
Carl Brummer (1864 in Bogense — 1953), architect
Carl Peter Hermann Christensen (1869 in Særslev — 1936), the last Danish executioner
Martin Knudsen (1871 in Hasmark — 1949), physicist
Hans Peder Steensby (1875 — 1920), ethnographer, geographer and professor
Petra Petersen (born 1901 in Nørre Højrup — 1989), politician and resistance fighter during the Nazi occupation of Denmark
Herdis von Magnus (1912 in Bogense — 1992), virologist and polio expert
Allan Hansen (born 1949 in Bogense), chairman of Danish Football Association
Allan K. Pedersen (born 1962 in Veflinge), businessman and sports team owner

Art
Inger Møller (1886 in Otterup — 1979), silversmith
Aase Hansen (1935 in Vigerslev — 1993), actress
Leif Davidsen (born 1950 in Otterup), author and journalist
Jens Albinus (born 1965 in Bogense), actor and director

Sport

Hans Schultz (1864 — 1937), sport shooter and founder of the Schultz & Larsen rifle company
Jørgen Møller (1873 in Otterup — 1944), chess player
Aage Berntsen (1885 in Særslev — 1952), Olympic fencer
Svend Aage Frederiksen (1920 in Bogense — 1999), Olympic athlete
Uffe Schultz Larsen (1921 in Otterup — 2005), Olympic shooter
Niels Rasmussen (1922 in Søndersø — 1991), Olympic rower
Keld Gantzhorn (born 1954 in Gamby), footballer and manager
Mogens Just Mikkelsen (born 1962 in Bogense), Olympic sailor
Peter Ravn (born 1962 in Bogense), motorcycle speedway rider
Jesper Bøge Pedersen (born 1990 in Bogense), footballer
Patrick Banggaard (born 1994 in Otterup), footballer
Benjamin Hansen (born 1994 in Bogense), footballer

Notes

References

External links 

  

 
Municipalities of the Region of Southern Denmark
Municipalities of Denmark
Populated places established in 2007